Treaty of Antwerp may refer to:

Treaty of Antwerp (1609)
Treaty of Antwerp (1715) (also known as the third Barrier Treaty)